The following is a list of the exports of South Korea. Data is for 2012, in millions of United States dollars, as reported by The Observatory of Economic Complexity. Currently the top twenty exports are listed.

References
 atlas.media.mit.edu - Observatory of Economic complexity - Products exported by South Korea (2012)

Foreign trade of South Korea
South Korea
Exports